The Mageough Home for Aged Females, commonly known as the Mageough , is a 19th-century retirement home in southern Dublin, Ireland.

History

The Mageough Home was built by the bequest of Miss Elizabeth Mageough, who died in 1869 and left much of her money to fund "a suitable place for elderly ladies of the Protestant faith to live." The home was built by to the designs of James Rawson Carroll on land purchased from William Cowper-Temple, 1st Baron Mount Temple. The site was known locally as "The Bloody Fields"; 2,000 Catholic and Royalist troops had been killed by Roundheads and buried there during the Irish Confederate Wars. The first residents moved in November 1878. They were required to be "of good character and sobriety." In 1883, Rev. Benjamin Gibson was chaplain, Richard J. Leeper was registrar and a Mrs Le Breton Simmons was lady superintendent.

It is still run today as a residential complex for older people with 36 small homes.

Structure
The complex is built of red brick and slate in a Gothic Revival style. Thirty-nine houses, an infirmary and a Church of Ireland chapel surround a central green.

The houses, chapel, infirmary, gate lodge, stone boundary walls, gate piers and gates are all protected structures.

References

External links

Housing for the elderly
Rathmines
1878 establishments in Ireland
Residential buildings completed in 1878